Ebrahimabad (also Romanized as Ebrāhīmābād) is a village in Ferdows Rural District, in the Central District of Shahriar County, Tehran Province, Iran. At the 2006 census, its population was 1,488, in 398 families.

References 

Populated places in Shahriar County